A Sorcery Written in Blood was the first demo released by Norwegian black metal band Gorgoroth. The title of the demo was taken from the lyrics of the song "The Return of Darkness and Evil" by the band Bathory. The demo was released in 1993 as a limited edition hand-numbered cassette. A 7" vinyl bootleg also existed; however, there were no official reissues. Due to the Satanic imagery used on the demo cover, the newspaper Firda in Førde in Sogn og Fjordane, Norway, ran a front-page story on the demo and Gorgoroth on 7 January 1994. The demo led to the band landing a record deal with French record label Embassy Productions. The track "Sexual Bloodgargling" was an early version of the song "Ritual", re-recorded for Gorgoroth's first album Pentagram.

Track listing

Gorgoroth
Hat – vocals
Infernus – guitar
Kjettar – bass
Goat Pervertor – drums

References

Gorgoroth albums
Demo albums
1993 albums
Self-released albums